Uwe Westendorf (born 1 April 1966) is a German former wrestler. He competed in the men's freestyle 74 kg at the 1988 Summer Olympics.

References

External links
 

1966 births
Living people
German male sport wrestlers
Olympic wrestlers of East Germany
Wrestlers at the 1988 Summer Olympics
People from Potsdam-Mittelmark
Sportspeople from Brandenburg